Cookham Dean is a village to the west of the village of Cookham in Berkshire, England. It is the highest point of all the Cookhams (Cookham Rise, Cookham Village and Cookham Dean).

Commerce
Cookham Dean is served by two pubs, Uncle Tom's Cabin and The Jolly Farmer, a restaurant called The Mango Lounge (opened in late 2016) at the Chequers and a hotel/inn called The Sanctum on The Green. There are no shops in the village following the closure of the Post Office some years ago.  There is an additional pub, The Bounty, on the river bank with access only by foot or boat and open in the summer and winter weekends.

Geography
Cookham Dean has a site of Special Scientific Interest (SSSI) and local nature reserve on the eastern edge of the village, called Bisham Woods. It neighbours Cookham Village, Marlow, Furze Platt and Pinkneys Green.

Notable residents 
The village was the home of actor and comedian Tim Brooke-Taylor (1940–2020), who was involved in local events.
Russian Princess Sofka Skipwith (1907–1994) lived with her second husband Grey Skipwith at Dean Cottage in the 1930s.

References

Villages in Berkshire
Cookham